The Hospital Broadcasting Association (HBA) supports the 210 or so independent hospital broadcasting organisations serving hospitals, hospices and nursing homes in the UK. The vast majority of these organisations provide hospital radio services through a variety of broadcast medium as well as a few hospital television services.

HBA's patron is the former Head of Presentation at BBC Radio 2, Alan Dedicoat, who before joining the BBC started his radio life in the hospital radio "trade".

Function

Advice and guidance 
HBA provides advice and guidance to the management of the stations on all aspects of running a hospital broadcasting organisation. This is available via its website, its members' magazine, at national conferences, regional events and in response to specific enquiries. This expertise is vital to the stations, as many of a station's members will not have had previous experience in either broadcasting, running or managing an organisation.

The HBA also provides regular training events for those involved with the associations member stations; attracting guest speakers who have a wealth of professional experience in radio broadcasting and interview techniques, radio technology or the finer points of computer based broadcasting software. In addition HBA offers training and support on numerous administration elements of managing a charity.

National representation
HBA represents hospital broadcasting at a national level, engaging with appropriate national organisations such as:
 the NHS
 the Dept of Health
 Ofcom
 the copyright collecting societies PPL, PRS and MCPS
 the charity regulators Charity Commission and OSCR
 the government's Office of the Third Sector

National Hospital Radio Awards
The HBA stages the National Hospital Radio Awards annually to encourage volunteers to produce better programmes, recognising volunteers within the HBA and its member stations that deserve recognition for going the extra mile in their work. The awards are presented at the HBA Annual National Conference held in the Spring of each year.  for association members and the general public to see in full.

2022
National Hospital Radio Awards 2022.

Structure

Legal status 
The HBA is a company limited by guarantee (number 2750147) and is registered as a charity (number 1015501) with the Charity Commission for England and Wales. Its official name is the National Association of Hospital Broadcasting Organisations, but adopted Hospital Broadcasting Association as its working name in the 1990s.

Regions
 Anglia
 Home Counties
 London
 Midlands
 North
 North West
 Northern Ireland
 Scotland
 South
 South East
 Wales & West
 Yorkshire

References

External links
 Hospital Broadcasting Association
 

Hospital radio stations
Organizations established in 1992
1992 establishments in the United Kingdom
Health charities in the United Kingdom
Radio organisations in the United Kingdom
Borough of North Lincolnshire
Public broadcasting in the United Kingdom